The Tenth Van Cliburn International Piano Competition took place in Fort Worth, Texas from May 23 to June 8, 1997. Jon Nakamatsu won the competition, while Yakov Kasman and Aviram Reichert were awarded the Silver and bronze medals.

William Bolcom composed his Nine Bagatelles for the competition.

Jurors

  John Giordano (chairman)
  Marius Constant
  Dean Elder
  Claude Frank
  Ian Hobson
  Warren Jones
  Jerome Lowenthal
  Hiroko Nakamura
  Lev Naumov
  Cécile Ousset
  Menahem Pressler
  Piero Rattalino
  Dubravka Tomšič
  Alexis Weissenberg

Results

References

Van Cliburn International Piano Competition